is a Japanese model and weathercaster who is represented by the talent agency Stardust Promotion.

Filmography

TV series

TV dramas

Films

References

External links
Official agency profile 

Japanese female models
Japanese television personalities
1988 births
Living people
People from Hokkaido
Stardust Promotion artists
Models from Hokkaido